The Eurofly Flash Light (sometimes styled by the manufacturer as FLASHlight) is an Italian ultralight aircraft, designed and produced by Eurofly Srl, of Galliera Veneta. The aircraft is supplied as a kit for amateur construction or as a complete ready-to-fly-aircraft.

Design and development
The aircraft was designed to comply with the Fédération Aéronautique Internationale microlight rules. It features a strut-braced high-wing, a two-seats-in-side-by-side configuration enclosed cockpit, fixed tricycle landing gear and a single engine in tractor configuration.

The aircraft fuselage is made from welded steel tubing, with the wing made from aluminum tubing, all covered in heat-shrunk Dacron aircraft fabric.

Specifications (Flash Light)

References

External links

Flash Light
2000s Italian ultralight aircraft
Homebuilt aircraft
Single-engined tractor aircraft